is a Japanese former competitive figure skater who is the 1979 World bronze medalist and an eight-time Japanese national champion. She was the first skater to medal for Japan in ladies' singles at the World Championships.

Personal life 
Watanabe's mother is Filipino and father is Japanese. She graduated from Golden Valley High School in Minnesota.

Skating career 
In the 1972–73 season, Watanabe won Japanese national titles on both the junior and senior levels. She then made her World Championship debut, finishing 17th.

In the 1975–76 season, Watanabe took bronze at the 1975 Skate Canada International and then won her fourth national title. She was assigned to the 1976 Winter Olympics and finished 13th. She was 17th in her final event of the season, the 1976 World Championships.

Watanabe broke into the World top ten at the 1978 World Championships, placing 8th. The next season, she won the bronze medal at 1979 Worlds, becoming the first Japanese lady to medal at the event.

In her final competitive season, Watanabe won gold at the 1979 NHK Trophy and then won her eighth national title. She placed 6th at the 1980 Winter Olympics. She ended her competitive career at the 1980 World Championships, where she placed 4th.

Later career 
After retiring from competitive skating, Watanabe went into show business and helped to popularize figure skating in Japan while becoming a national celebrity through her numerous appearances on television and in magazines and newspapers.

Since the 1990s, she has come to be known as "a troublemaker". She wrote muckraking books about trouble with some TV personalities, skaters and Japanese winter sports tycoon Yoshiaki Tsutsumi. She also often appears on reality television series which follows overweight celebrities as they try to lose weight.

Watanabe ran for The House of Councilors election in 2001 from Liberal League, but lost.

Results

References

External links
Official site

Navigation

1959 births
Living people
Figure skaters at the 1976 Winter Olympics
Figure skaters at the 1980 Winter Olympics
Figure skating commentators
Japanese expatriate sportspeople in the United States
Japanese female single skaters
Japanese people of Filipino descent
Liberal League (Japan) politicians
Olympic figure skaters of Japan
Sportspeople from Tokyo
World Figure Skating Championships medalists